is a former Japanese football player who featured for Fagiano Okayama.

Club statistics
Updated to 2 February 2018.

References

External links

Profile at Fagiano Okayama

1986 births
Living people
Ryutsu Keizai University alumni
Association football people from Chiba Prefecture
Japanese footballers
J2 League players
Fagiano Okayama players
Association football goalkeepers